Kevin Dilworth (born 14 February 1974 in Jacksonville, Texas) is an American retired track and field athlete who specialized in the long jump. He represented his country at the 1997 and 1999 World Championships.

Competition record

Personal bests
Outdoor
200 metres – 20.98 (1996)
Long jump – 8.47 (+1.9 m/s) (Abilene 1996)
Indoor
55 metres – 6.35 (Lubbock 2001)
Long jump – 8.20 (Joplin 2002)

References

1974 births
Living people
American male long jumpers
People from Jacksonville, Texas
Competitors at the 1998 Goodwill Games
Competitors at the 2001 Goodwill Games
Athletes (track and field) at the 2003 Pan American Games
Pan American Games track and field athletes for the United States